"Never Say Never" is a song recorded by American recording artist Brandy Norwood. The song was written by  Rodney "Darkchild" Jerkins, LaShawn Daniels, Fred Jerkins III, Japhe Tajeda, Rick Williams, and Norwood for her same-titled second studio album, released in 1998, featuring main production by Jerkins and additional production by Norwood. The song was released along with "U Don't Know Me (Like U Used To)" as a promotional single in German-speaking Europe only in 2000, where it failed to chart or sell noticeably.

Track listings
German CD Single
 "Never Say Never" (Jazz Animal Remix) – 4:25
 "U Don't Know Me (Like U Used To)" (Remix; featuring Shaunta & Da Brat) – 3:59
 "U Don't Know Me (Like U Used To)" (Album Version) – 4:27
 "Never Say Never" (Album Version) – 5:09

US 12" promo single
 "U Don't Know Me (Like U Used To)" (Rodney Jerkins Remix; featuring Shaunta & Da Brat) – 3:59
 "U Don't Know Me (Like U Used To)" (Rodney Jerkins Instrumental) – 5:31
 "U Don't Know Me (Like U Used To)" (Album Version) – 4:27
 "U Don't Know Me (Like U Used To)" (Remix A Capella) – 4:45
 "Never Say Never" (Jazz Animal Remix) – 4:25
 "Never Say Never" (Jazz Animal Remix Instrumental) – 5:31
 "Never Say Never" (Album Version) – 5:09
 "Never Say Never" (A Capella) – 5:29

Credits and personnel
Credits are taken from Never Say Never liner notes.

 Composer – Brandy Norwood, Rodney Jerkins, LaShawn Daniels, Fred Jerkins III, Japhe Tajeda, Rick Williams
 Production – Rodney "Darkchild" Jerkins
 Additional production – Brandy Norwood

References

External links
 ForeverBrandy.com — official site

1997 songs
2000 singles
Brandy Norwood songs
Song recordings produced by Rodney Jerkins
Songs written by Rodney Jerkins
Songs written by LaShawn Daniels
Songs written by Fred Jerkins III
Atlantic Records singles
Songs written by Brandy Norwood
Contemporary R&B ballads
Pop ballads
1990s ballads